Patrick Fitzgerald (born 1960) is the former United States Attorney for the Northern District of Illinois.

Patrick Fitzgerald may also refer to:

Patrik Fitzgerald (born 1956), British singer-songwriter
Pat Fitzgerald (born 1974), football coach
Patrick Fitzgerald (Irish judge), fourteenth century judge
Patrick Fitzgerald (1882–1965), actor, better known as Creighton Hale

See also
Pat Fitzgerald (disambiguation)